Dario Venitucci (born 30 January 1987) is an Italian football midfielder who currently plays for Luparense.

Club career

Juventus
Venitucci began his youth career with his hometown club Juventus, and was promoted to the Primavera youth set-up in 2004. He was part of the squad that won the 2006 Campionato Nazionale Primavera, the first time Juventus have won it in twelve years. Venitucci was called up to the first team squad in for the 2006-07 season when Juventus had been relegated to Serie B due to the Calciopoli scandal, and was part of the team that led Juventus back to Serie A in 2007. Venitucci made his first team debut on 25 November 2006 against U.S. Lecce, replacing Claudio Marchisio in the 74th minute. He also made his first start for Juventus against Lecce later in the season, in a 3–1 win. In all Venitucci made 12 appearances in all competitions for Juventus that season.

F.B.C. Treviso
After Juventus were promoted back to Serie A, Venitucci was sent out on loan like many of his fellow youngsters. In July 2007, he was signed by Serie B side Treviso on a season long loan. Venitucci scored 3 goals in 20 league matches for the club, helping the club avoid relegation to the Lega Pro Prima Divisione. On 30 June 2008 Venitucci returned to Juventus.

Mantova and Avellino
Following his return, Juventus again opted to loan out the rising star to Serie B side Mantova, in order to gain first team experience. However, in January 2009 Juventus decided to recall him due to the lack of games. He was simultaneously loaned out to Serie B strugglers US Avellino, as they felt this move would prove more successful than the short lived loan at Mantova. With Avellino, Venitucci established himself in the club's starting line-up and he scored 2 goals in 18 league appearances.

A.C. Arezzo
In June 2009, Venitucci returned to Turin but did not figure in Ciro Ferrara's plans. He moved to third division club A.C. Arezzo on loan along with teammates Oussama Essabr, Andrea Pisani, and Riccardo Maniero. With Arezzo, he was a regular starter and performed well in his lone season with the club, making, in all 29 league appearances, scoring 3 goals.

Bassano Virtus
On 30 June 2010 Venitucci returned to his parent club but was almost instantly sold to Lega Pro side Bassano Virtus on a co-ownership agreement. With the third division side, Venitucci again established himself in the starting line-up and went on to make 27 league appearances, scoring a single goal, and notching up 8 yellow cards. In June 2011 Bassano acquired Venitucci and Samon Reider Rodriguez outright from Juventus.

Following a stellar season with the mid-table side, Venitucci was signed by U.S. Foggia, a club that nearly gained promotion to Serie B in the 2010-11 Lega Pro season.

Foggia
On 15 July 2011 Venitucci was signed by Lega Pro Prima Divisione team U.S. Foggia.

Carrarese 
After the bankruptcy of Foggia, he joined Carrarese Calcio.

Bassano Virtus
Venitucci re-joined former club Bassano Virtus for a second time on 17 July 2017.

Luparense
On 3 July 2019 it was confirmed, that Venitucci had joined Luparense.

References

External links
 
 

1987 births
Living people
Italian footballers
Juventus F.C. players
Treviso F.B.C. 1993 players
Mantova 1911 players
U.S. Avellino 1912 players
S.S. Arezzo players
Bassano Virtus 55 S.T. players
Calcio Foggia 1920 players
Carrarese Calcio players
A.S.D. Barletta 1922 players
Santarcangelo Calcio players
U.S. Livorno 1915 players
A.C. Renate players
Serie B players
Serie C players
Association football midfielders
Footballers from Turin